Guitar Superstar is a yearly competition hosted by the Guitar Player magazine in which 10 finalists compete for the title of Guitar Superstar or Guitar Hero for the year.  The competition started in 2005 as the Guitar Hero Competition but was changed in 2008 to the current title, probably to avoid confusion with the Guitar Hero video game series.

Guitar Hero '05 
Held at the Rock and Roll Hall of Fame in Cleveland, Ohio, on June 10, 2005.
Finalists:
Dominic Frasca (Winner)
Rodney VerBrugge (First Runner-Up)
Marcus Deml (Second Runner-Up)
Juan Carlos Coronado
Scott Jones
Ulf Högberg

Judges: Joe Satriani, Steve Lukather, Trevor Lukather, DJ Munch, and Jude Gold.

Guitar Hero '06 
Held at the Great American Music Hall in San Francisco, California, on September 23, 2006.

Video of the competition on Guitar Player TV

Finalists:
 Trey Alexander (First Place) (video)
 Patrick Woods (Second Place) (video)
 David Powers (Third Place) (video)
 Joshua Karickhoff
 Joe Cefalu
 Nathan Hahn
 Ed DeGenaro
 Ron LoCurto
 Sergei Roudzinski
 Anton Tsygankov

Judges: Joe Satriani, Steve Lukather, Richie Kotzen, Rafael Moreira, Shredmistress Rynata, and Steve Read.

Guitar Hero '07 

Held at the Great American Music Hall in San Francisco, California, on October 12, 2007.

Video of the competition.

Finalists:
 Ladd Smith (Nashville, Tennessee) (First Place) (video)
 Les Robot (real name: Cory Melnychuk) (Edmonton, Alberta) (Second Place) (video)
 Danny B. Harvey (Canyon Country, California) (Third Place) (video)
 Jamie Robinson (Toronto, Ontario)
 Juan Coronado (Whitby, Ontario)
 Tony Smotherman (Jacksonville, Florida)
 Taka Minamino (Hollywood, California)
 Curtis Fornadley (Playa Del Rey, California)
 Casey Harshbarger (Indianapolis, Indiana)
 Chris Peters (Orlando, Florida)

Judges: Joe Satriani, Steve Lukather, Nuno Bettencourt, Elliot Easton, Greg Howe, and Mike Varney.

Host: Brendon Small.

Guitar Hero 06 winner Trey Alexander also came back to battle Guitar Hero III expert Mark Johnson.  Johnson played Lay Down by Priestess on GH3 while Alexander played the riffs with his Peavey HP Special.

Guitar Superstar '08 

Was held at the Great American Music Hall in San Francisco, California, on September 13, 2008.

Finalists: 
 Vicki Genfan (Winner)
 Daddo Oreskovich (First Runner-Up)
 Makana (Second Runner-Up)
 Dan Peters
 Eric Barnett
 Mark Orlando
 Christopher Schreiner aka The Guy

Judges: Joe Satriani, George Lynch, Steve Vai, Elliot Easton and Brendon Small.

Host: Andy Summers

Guitar Superstar '09 

Finalists:
Steve Senes (Winner)
Krisz Simonfalvi (First Runner-Up)
Brian Davidson (Second Runner-Up)
Dave Benzinger 
Brodie Cumming 
Hercules Castro
Danny Jones
Steve Langemo 
Doug Towle
Jeff Zampillo

Judges: Steve Lukather, Elliot Easton, Jennifer Batten, Earl Slick and Greg Hampton.

Host: Brendon Small

Guitar Superstar '10 
Finalists:
Don Alder (Winner)
Eric Clemenzi (First Runner-Up)
Charlie Crowe (Second Runner-Up)
Angel Vivaldi
Dan Kumar
Jodee Frawlee
Karim Khorsheed
Kevin Zugschwert 
Ignacio Di Salvo
Val Kostadinov

Judges: George Lynch, Elliot Easton, Reeves Gabrels, and Gary Hoey.

Host: Nikki Blakk

Guitar Superstar '11 
Finalists:
Mark Kroos (Winner)
Fredrik Strand Halland (First Runner-Up)
Arek Religa (Second Runner-Up)
Jeremy Ore
Forrest Lee, Jr.
 Kevin E.Holdren(Viewer's Choice Winner)

Judges: Muriel Anderson, Carl Verheyen, and Reeves Gabrels.

Host: Larry Carlton

References 

Guitar competitions